James David Martin (1 July 1901 — 19 March 1988) was a Scottish first-class cricketer and administrator.

Martin was born in July 1901 in Edinburgh and was educated there at George Watson's College. A club cricketer for Watsonians Cricket Club, he made his debut for Scotland in first-class cricket against Ireland at Greenock in 1926. He made two further appearances in first-class cricket for Scotland in 1929, against Ireland at Dublin and the touring South Africans at Perth. Playing on the Scottish side as a batsman, he scored 101 runs at an average of 25.25; he made one half-century, a score of 88 against Ireland in 1929. Martin later served as the president of the Scottish Cricket Union in 1947, succeeding William Anderson. Outside of cricket, he was a grain merchant by profession. Martin died in Edinburgh in March 1988.

References

External links
 

1901 births
1988 deaths
Cricketers from Edinburgh
People educated at George Watson's College
Scottish merchants
Scottish cricketers
Scottish cricket administrators